Bennelong SwissWellness Cycling Team p/b Cervelo was an Australian UCI Continental cycling team focusing on road bicycle racing. Based in Tasmania since its establishment in 2000, the team's original title sponsor was a Tasmanian restaurant chain, Praties, but Genesys Wealth Advisers, an Australian financial planning network, has taken over this role in 2010. The team was founded by Andrew Christie-Johnson and Steve Price.

In 2014 team was the top ranked team in Australia's National Road Series (NRS). It has competed overseas in the Tour of Qinghai Lake (2.HC), Tour de Taiwan (2.2) and the Herald Sun Tour (2.1).

The team was invited to compete in the Team Time Trial of the 2013 UCI Road World Championships as the Oceania representative.

For the 2016 season the team secured the sponsorship of sports nutrition company, IsoWhey Sports.

For the 2017 season the team merged with SwissWellness, securing the teams immediate future after Avanti announced they would stop sponsoring the team in October 2016

The 2018 season saw Bennelong Funds Management secure primary naming rights of the team.

Team roster
As at 31 December 2018

Major wins

2008
Stage 2 Tour of Wellington, Richie Porte
2009
Stage 2 Giro della Regione Friuli Venezia Giulia, Richie Porte
2010
Stage 4 Tour of Wellington, Joel Pearson
Stage 1 Tour de Taiwan, Will Clarke
2011
 Overall Herald Sun Tour, Nathan Haas
Japan Cup, Nathan Haas
2012
Stage 1 New Zealand Cycle Classic, Campbell Flakemore
Stages 1 & 3 Tour de Taiwan, Anthony Giacoppo
Stages 2 & 4 Tour of Borneo, Nathan Earle
Stage 3 Tour of Borneo, Anthony Giacoppo
Prologue Tour de Kumano, Anthony Giacoppo
2013
Stage 1 Herald Sun Tour, Aaron Donnelly
Stage 3 Herald Sun Tour, Nathan Earle
 Overall New Zealand Cycle Classic, Nathan Earle
Stage 1 (ITT), Joseph Cooper
Stages 2 & 4, Nathan Earle
Stage 2 Tour de Taiwan, Nathan Earle
Stage 4 Tour of Japan, Ben Dyball
Stage 5 Tour of Japan, Nathan Earle
Stage 2 Jelajah Malaysia, Aaron Donnelly
Stage 4 Jelajah Malaysia, Anthony Giacoppo
2014
Stage 3 New Zealand Cycle Classic, Brenton Jones
Stages 7 & 9 Tour de Singkarak, Brenton Jones
2015
 Overall New Zealand Cycle Classic, Taylor Gunman
Prologue, Joseph Cooper	
Stage 1, Jason Christie
Stage 4 Herald Sun Tour, Patrick Bevin
The REV Classic, Patrick Bevin
Stage 2 Tour de Taiwan, Patrick Bevin
Prologue & Stage 1 Tour de Kumano, Neil Van der Ploeg
Stage 4 Tour de Korea, Patrick Bevin
Prologue Tour of China I, Neil Van der Ploeg
Tour de Okinawa, Jason Christie
2016
 Overall New Zealand Cycle Classic, Ben O'Connor
Stage 4, Ben O'Connor
Overall Tour de Taiwan, Robbie Hucker
Stage 5, Robbie Hucker
Stages 1 & 3 Tour of Japan, Anthony Giacoppo
Stage 8 Tour of Japan, Sam Crome
2017 
 Overall New Zealand Cycle Classic, Joseph Cooper
Stage 1, Tim Roe
Stage 2, Sam Crome
Stage 1 Tour de Langkawi, Scott Sunderland
Stage 3 Tour de Korea, Scott Sunderland
Prologue & Stage 5 Tour de Hongrie, Scott Sunderland
Stages 3 & 4 (ITT) Tour of China I, Joseph Cooper
2018
Stage 4 Herald Sun Tour, Sam Crome
Stage 4 Tour de Taiwan, Cameron Bayly
Commonwealth Games Road Race, Steele Von Hoff
Young rider classification Tour of Japan, Chris Harper
Stage 4 Tour de Korea, Joseph Cooper
Prologue & Stage 2 Tour of China II, Anthony Giacoppo

World, Continental & National Champions

2013
 New Zealand Time Trial, Joseph Cooper
2014
 New Zealand Time Trial, Taylor Gunman
 Oceania Time Trial, Joseph Cooper
 World U23 Time Trial, Campbell Flakemore
2015
 New Zealand Road Race, Joseph Cooper
2016
 Oceania Time Trial, Sean Lake
 Oceania Road Race, Sean Lake
2017
 New Zealand Road Race, Joseph Cooper
2018
 Oceania Road Race, Chris Harper
 Australia Track (Madison), Alexander Porter

National Road Series

2012
 Stage 3 Mersey Valley Tour, Nathan Earle
 Stage 2 North Western Tour, Anthony Giacoppo
 Stage 3 Tour of Gippsland, Anthony Giacoppo
 Overall Tour of the Great South Coast, Anthony Giacoppo
Stages 1 & 3, Brenton Jones
Stage 7, Anthony Giacoppo
Stage 9, Campbell Flakemore
 Stages 2, 3 & 5 Tour of the Murray River, Anthony Giacoppo
 Stages 4 & 14 Tour of the Murray River, Joel Pearson
 Stage 9 Tour of the Murray River, Campbell Flakemore
 Stage 1 (TTT), Tour of Tasmania
 Stage 8, Campbell Flakemore
2013
 Overall Woodside Tour de Perth, Joseph Cooper
Stage 2 (ITT), Joseph Cooper
Stage 3, Nathan Earle
 Overall Battle on the Border, Jack Haig
Stage 1, Jack Haig
Stage 2, Anthony Giacoppo
Stage 3 (ITT), Joseph Cooper
 Overall Tour of Toowoomba, Nathan Earle
Stage 2, Nathan Earle
Stage 3 (TTT)
 Overall Santos North West Tour, Nathan Earle
Stage 1 (ITT), Jack Haig
Stage 4, Nathan Earle
 Stages 1, 4 & 6 Tour of Gippsland, Anthony Giacoppo
 Stages 3, 4 & 5 Tour of the Great South West, Anthony Giacoppo
2014
 Overall Tour de Perth, Joseph Cooper
Stage 3, Joseph Cooper
 Stage 2 Adelaide Tour, Brenton Jones
 Stage 4 Adelaide Tour, Jack Beckinsale
 Overall Battle on the Border, Joseph Cooper
Stage 1, Mark O'Brien
Stage 3, Joseph Cooper
Stage 4, Scott Law
 Overall Tour of Toowoomba, Jack Haig
Stages 1 & 5, Neil van der Ploeg
Stage 2, Jack Haig
Stage 3, TTT
 Stages 1, 3 & 4 Tour of the Murray River, Brenton Jones
 Overall Tour of the Great South Coast, Brenton Jones
Stages 3 & 5, Brenton Jones
 Stage 1 Tour of Gippsland, Scott Law

References

External links

Cycling teams based in Australia
UCI Continental Teams (Oceania)
Cycling teams established in 2000